Imran Rahman is a renowned academician and cultural figure in Bangladesh. He is the Vice-Chancellor of the University of Liberal Arts Bangladesh (ULAB). He was special adviser to ULAB's Board of Trustees. Professor Rahman is serving as the vice chancellor of the (ULAB) for the second time. Imran Rahman began his career at the ULAB as the Director of the School of Business in 2006 and later became the Vice-Chancellor from 2012 to 2016. He was the Pro-Vice-Chancellor of the University from 2009 to 2012. He spent 28 years at Institute of Business Administration (IBA)  as a teacher in the Department of Finance, Chairman of the BBA Program, and Chairman of the IBA Computer Center before joining ULAB.
As a co-founder, he founded a merchant bank in 1990 and managed it for 6 years as its Director. Imran Rahman has studied at Manchester Business School, Dhaka University, and the London School of Economics.
Imran Rahman is a vocalist and guitarist of Renaissance, a popular band in Bangladesh.

Education 
Imran Rahman was a Commonwealth Scholar and Doctoral Researcher at Manchester Business School, University of Manchester, England. He graduated from the London School of Economics and Political Science., England with a degree in Mathematical Economics and Economics. Obtained MBA from Dhaka University's IBA. Earlier, he did his O level from St. Joseph Higher Secondary School, Dhaka, And A level from Putney College for Further Education in England.

Career 
Currently, Imran Rahman is the Vice-Chancellor of the University of Liberal Arts Bangladesh. He was a special adviser to ULAB's Board of Trustees. Professor Rahman is serving as the vice-chancellor of the (ULAB) for the second time.[1][2][3] Imran Rahman began his career at the ULAB as the Director of the School of Business in 2006 and later served as the Vice-Chancellor from 2012 to 2016. He was the Pro-Vice-Chancellor of the University from 2009 to 2012. He spent 28 years at the Institute of Business Administration (IBA) as a Faculty member in the Department of Finance, Chairman of the BBA Program, and Chairman of the IBA Computer Center before joining ULAB. As a co-founder, he founded a merchant bank in 1990 and managed it for 6 years as its Director. .

Music 

Rahman grew up in a cultural environment. His aunt Laila Arjuman Banu was the first Muslim female singer of Radio Pakistan in Dhaka. His mother Maleka Parveen Banu was also a famous singer of Radio Pakistan. Imran Rahman joined the then very popular band Renaissance in 1998 as a member. His song, "Koto je Kotha", was recorded in 2004 firstly.

References

Further reading

External links 
 Vice Chancellor's Office of ULAB Web Page

Living people
University of Dhaka alumni
Male guitarists
21st-century Bangladeshi male singers
21st-century Bangladeshi singers
Academic staff of the University of Dhaka
1957 births
Vice-Chancellors of University of Liberal Arts Bangladesh
Academic staff of the University of Liberal Arts Bangladesh